This is a list based on estimated sales between 1952 (the first charts) and the end of 1999. Availability of sales figures, particularly in earlier decades, means that there is a great deal of uncertainty over the accuracy of these estimates.

Singles are a type of music release defined by the British organisation the Official Charts Company (OCC) as having fewer than four tracks and not lasting longer than 25 minutes. Sales of singles in the United Kingdom have been monitored since 1952, when Percy Dickins of NME contacted a sample of 20 shops to asking what their 10 best-selling singles for that week had been. Dickins compiled the results into a Top 12 hit parade, which eventually became the UK Singles Chart. On 16 November 2002, Channel 4 broadcast a television programme to commemorate the 50th anniversary of the chart, which counted down the biggest-selling singles up to that point. The song at number one was "Candle in the Wind 1997" / "Something About the Way You Look Tonight" by Elton John, a charity single released to commemorate the death of Diana, Princess of Wales. The artist that appeared the most on the chart was The Beatles, who had released five of the biggest-selling singles of the century.

The top 69 entries in this list had sold 1 million copies by the end of 1999, although subsequently "Three Lions" and "3 Lions '98" by Baddiel & Skinner & The Lightning Seeds—which were both certified Platinum—had their sales combined, meaning that most commentators record there as having been 70 million sellers before 2000.

Singles

References
General (chart positions)

Specific

20th century
20th century in the United Kingdom